The 2000 Speedway World Team Cup was the 41st edition of the FIM Speedway World Team Cup to determine the team world champions. It was the last time that the event was known as the Speedway World Team Cup because as from 2001 it was called the Speedway World Cup.

The final took place at Brandon Stadium in Coventry, England. The World Championship was decided by a race-off after Sweden and Great Britain tied on 40 points. Tony Rickardsson beat Mark Loram to give Sweden an eighth title.

Quarter-final

Venue : Blijham, Holland

Norway to Semi-Final

Venue : Lonigo, Italy

Italy to Semi-Final

Semi-final

Venue : Częstochowa, Poland

Sweden to World Final

Venue : Landshut, Germany

USA to World Final

World final

Venue : Coventry, England

Sweden win Championship after Tony Rickardsson beat Mark Loram in a race off.

See also
 2000 Speedway Grand Prix

References

Speedway World Team Cup
2000 in speedway